Mangifera decandra is a species of mango trees in the genus Mangifera (family Anacardiaceae). It was described by Ding Hou in 1972.

Etymology
The specific name "decandra" means "with ten stamens" in Latin.

Description
Mangifera decandra trees stand up to 39 metres in height, with a diameter of 75 cm dbh. The mangoes are 10 centimetres long, with green-reddish-brown skin and whitish flesh. They have a sweet-sour flavour. The flowers are pinkish-red in colour, are 4 millimetres in diameter, and occur in panicles. The leaves occur in whorls and lack stipules.

Distribution and ecology
Mangifera decandra is known from Sumatra and Borneo, where it occurs in undisturbed lowland forests made up predominantly of dipterocarp trees. Domestically, it is planted as a fruit tree in forest gardens. The trees can survive at a maximum altitude of 800 metres, although they typically dwell much lower.

References

Plants described in 1972
decandra
Trees of Asia